Imposing was a notable Australian thoroughbred racehorse.

He was a chestnut son of Todman from the Arctic Explorer mare Hialeah.

Some of his major race victories included the 1979 AJC  Epsom Handicap, AJC George Main Stakes and the STC Hill Stakes.

Stud career
Imposing produced six individual Group 1 winners during his stud career:

Notable Progeny

'c = colt, f = filly, g = gelding

References

1975 racehorse births
Racehorses bred in Australia
Racehorses trained in Australia
Thoroughbred family 1-c